Wild Rose is a 2018 British musical drama film directed by Tom Harper and starring Jessie Buckley, Julie Walters, Sophie Okonedo, Jamie Sives, Craig Parkinson, James Harkness, Janey Godley, Daisy Littlefield, Ryan Kerr, Adam Mitchell, and Nicole Kerr. The screenplay was written by Nicole Taylor.

The film had its world premiere at the Toronto International Film Festival on 8 September 2018 and was released on 12 April 2019, by Entertainment One in the United Kingdom.

The film received positive reviews, with Buckley earning a nomination for the BAFTA Award for Best Actress in a Leading Role for her performance.

Plot

Rose-Lynn Harlan, aspiring country singer and single mother of two from Glasgow, is released after a year in prison for attempted drug smuggling after throwing a package of heroin over the wall into HM Prison Cornton Vale despite claiming that she did not know what was in the package. She has lost her longstanding job in the house band at Glasgow's Grand Ole Opry, as the manager won't employ a convicted criminal. Rose-Lynn's mother, Marion, who has been caring for Rose-Lynn's young children, encourages her to give up her music dream to focus on a steady job and taking care of her children.

Rose-Lynn takes a cleaning job at Susannah's large house. Susannah's children overhear Rose-Lynn singing while she is cleaning and tell their mother. Rose-Lynn asks Susannah for money to travel to Nashville to try to make it as a musician, but she declines. Instead, she contacts BBC Radio presenter, Bob Harris, sending him a recording of Rose-Lynn singing; he offers to meet with her if she comes to London. Rose-Lynn appears before a judge to ask him to lift her probationary 7pm to 7am curfew so she can travel, and he agrees. She travels by train to London, and sits in on a live performance by the visiting Ashley McBryde. Harris encourages her to keep performing and figure out what she has to say so she can start writing her own songs.

Susannah offers Rose-Lynn a performing gig at her upcoming house party, where she intends to ask her guests to contribute to Rose-Lynn's Nashville fund in lieu of gifts. Rose-Lynn asks Marion to watch the children in the week leading up to the party so she can rehearse, but Marion declines to cancel her holiday plans, so she is forced to shuttle her children around to various friends, who agree to watch them. The day before the performance, Susannah's husband gets Rose-Lynn alone and tells her he knows about her criminal conviction and she is to stop working for them after her performance.

Rose-Lynn's son breaks his arm while briefly left unattended at home, and the doctors at the hospital say they cannot put a cast on until after Rose-Lynn's planned performance. Marion arrives to help and Rose-Lynn begs her to stay and watch her son so she can get to the party; Marion agrees but criticises her strongly for neglecting her family. Rose-Lynn rushes to the performance but, once on stage, breaks down immediately. She confesses to Susannah her guilt for her criminal behaviour and not being there for her children, and her belief that her conviction and having children at a young age are permanent barriers to her musical dream, then leaves.

Rose-Lynn gets a job as a waitress and dedicates herself to her children. Some time later, Marion, seeing that Rose-Lynn has accepted her responsibilities, presents her with a large sum of money she has saved, enough to travel to Nashville. Rose-Lynn tries to reject it, but Marion expresses her regret about failing to accomplish her goals due to having children. Rose-Lynn travels to Nashville and finds how difficult it is to find gigs and get noticed. She sneaks on stage at the Ryman Auditorium during a backstage tour and sings an impromptu song to the empty building. A security guard approaches her afterward, offering to introduce her to a record producer, but Rose-Lynn decides to return to Glasgow, having realised that her future lies in her home town.

One year later, Rose-Lynn performs an original song at Celtic Connections titled “Glasgow (No Place Like Home)”, receiving raucous applause. Bob Harris, Susannah and her children are in the audience.

Cast

The film also features cameo appearances from Kacey Musgraves, Ashley McBryde and Bob Harris.

Release

The film had its world premiere at the Toronto International Film Festival on 8 September 2018. Shortly after, NEON acquired distribution rights to the film. It  screened at the BFI London Film Festival on 15 October 2018 and at South by Southwest in March 2019. It was released in the United Kingdom on 12 April 2019, by Entertainment One and in the United States on 21 June 2019 by NEON.

Soundtrack

Reception
Wild Rose received positive reviews from film critics. The site's consensus reads: "There's no shortage of star-is-born stories, but Wild Rose proves they can still be thoroughly entertaining -- and marks its own transcendent moment for lead Jessie Buckley." Metacritic reports a score of 80/100, based on 32 critics, indicating "Generally favorable reviews".

Accolades

Notes

References

External links
 
 
 
 
 

2018 films
2010s musical drama films
British musical drama films
Films about singers
Films about music and musicians
Films directed by Tom Harper
Films set in Scotland
Films set in Glasgow
Entertainment One films
Film4 Productions films
Neon (distributor) films
2018 independent films
2018 drama films
2010s English-language films
2010s British films
Films shot in Glasgow